Bill Burton Fishing Pier State Park (formerly the Choptank River Fishing Pier) is a public recreation area on the Choptank River in Trappe, Maryland.  The state park preserves portions of the former Choptank River Bridge as a pier, and includes  of land upriver from the pier in Talbot County.

The fishing pier was created after the Emerson C. Harrington Bridge, which had been dedicated in 1935 by President Franklin Roosevelt, was replaced with the Frederick C. Malkus Bridge in 1987. In 2011, the pier was renamed to honor Bill Burton, a long-time outdoors writer and Chesapeake Bay fishing advocate, who played a significant role in preserving the old bridge as a fishing pier when the new bridge was constructed.

References

External links
Bill Burton Fishing Pier State Park Maryland Department of Natural Resources
Bill Burton Fishing Pier State Park Trail Map Maryland Department of Natural Resources

Parks in Talbot County, Maryland
Parks in Dorchester County, Maryland
State parks of Maryland
U.S. Route 50
Protected areas established in 1987
1987 establishments in Maryland